Martin Vlček (born 5 February 1996) is a Slovak professional footballer who plays for Inter Bratislava as a forward.

Club career 
In 2014, Vlček was named "Player of the Tournament" in the CEE Cup. Vlček made his professional debut for AS Trenčín against ViOn Zlaté Moravce coming on as a 90th-minute substitute for Jairo.

References

External links 
 
 AS Trencin profile
 Martin Vlček at Sportsnet

1996 births
Living people
Slovak footballers
Slovak expatriate footballers
Association football forwards
AS Trenčín players
FK Inter Bratislava players
Mosta F.C. players
MŠK Púchov players
Slovak Super Liga players
2. Liga (Slovakia) players
Maltese Premier League players
Slovak expatriate sportspeople in Malta
Expatriate footballers in Malta
Sportspeople from Trenčín